Manoba major is a moth in the family Nolidae. It was described by George Hampson in 1891. It is found in India, Taiwan, Japan (the Ryukyu Islands), Myanmar, Singapore, as well as on Borneo, Java, Vanuatu and New Caledonia. Its habitat is coastal areas near mangroves.

The wingspan is about 20 mm. The forewings are fawn with two darker smudges on the costa. The hindwings are fawn, fading to white at the base.

References

Moths described in 1891
Nolinae